Holeček (feminine Holečková) is a Czech surname. Notable people include:
 Barbara Holecek, American film producer
 Jiří Holeček (born 1944), Czech ice hockey coach and former player
 John Holecek, American football player
 Josef Holeček (canoeist) (1921–2005), Czech canoer
 Josef Holeček (writer) (1853–1929), Czech writer
 Libuše Holečková, Czech actress
 Marek Holeček, Czech mountain climber
 Milan Holeček (born 1943), Czech tennis player
 Ondřej Holeček, Czech rower

See also
 Holetschek, a Germanized version of the surname

Czech-language surnames